Acacia clunies-rossiae, commonly known as kowmung wattle or kanangra wattle, is a shrub belonging to the genus Acacia and the subgenus Phyllodineae that is endemic to New South Wales.

It blooms from August to November and produces bright yellow flowers. The shrub blooms in early spring and groups of 8 to 25 flower-heads with a spherical shape and a golden yellow colour.

The species was first formally described by the botanist Joseph Maiden in 1916 as part of the work Notes on Acacia, (with description of new species) as published in the Journal and Proceedings of the Royal Society of New South Wales. It was reclassified as Racosperma clunies-rossiae in 2003 by Leslie Pedley and transferred back into the genus Acacia in 2006.

The wattle is found in eastern parts of the central coast of New South Wales in the watershed of the Kowmung and Coxs River and is restricted the area enclosed in the Kanangra-Boyd and Blue Mountains National Parks where it forms a part of dry sclerophyll forest communities and is found on rocky slopes growing in skeletal soils on alluvium along watercourses.

See also
 List of 'Acacia'' species

References

clunies-rossiae
Flora of New South Wales
Taxa named by Joseph Maiden
Plants described in 1916